Boris Podrecca (born 30 January 1940 in Belgrade) is a Slovene-Italian architect and urban designer living in Vienna, Austria. Podrecca is considered by some critics a pioneer of postmodernism. With some of his early works, such as the neuro-physiological institute at Stahremberg Palace (1982), he took a new, more tolerant attitude towards historical architectural forms.

Biography 
He was born in Belgrade, Serbia (then in Yugoslavia), to a Slovene father and a Serb mother. His father was a Slovene immigrant from the Italian border region known as Julian March (Venezia Giulia), who had fled to the Kingdom of Yugoslavia in order to escape persecution from the Italian Fascist regime. His original Slovene surname, Podreka, had been Italianized to Podrecca in the early 1930s. After World War II, the family moved to Trieste, Italy, where Boris attended a Slovene language elementary school.

In the 1960s, he moved to Vienna to study architecture at the University of Technology where he graduated in 1968 with Professor Roland Rainer. From 1979 to 1981 he worked as an assistant at Technical University of Munich and later, as a guest lecturer at Lausanne, Paris, Venice, Philadelphia, London, Harvard-Cambridge, Boston and Vienna. From 1988 until 2006 he was full professor at the Technical University of Stuttgart and Director of the Institute of Architectural Design and Theory of Space. He is a foreign member of the Serbian Academy of Sciences and Arts.

Boris Podrecca became famous with the exhibition of the work of the architect Carlo Scarpa in the church of Chiesa della Carita at the 1984 Venice Biennale and later  the Villes d'Eaux exhibition in Paris. He was also responsible for the exhibition of the work of Jože Plečnik in the Pompidou Centre in Paris (1986). As a leading exhibition designer he set up the Biedermeier (Vienna, 1987), Bismarck, Prussia, Germany and Europe (Berlin, 1990) and One Hundred Years of Austria exhibitions (1996).

Main works

Tartini Square, Piran, Slovenia, 1987–89
Piazza XXIV Maggio, Cormons, Italy, 1989–1990
Dirmhirngasse School, Vienna, 1991–1994
Museum of Modern Art, Ca' Pesaro, Venice, 1992–2002
Greif-Areal mixed-use development, Bolzano, Italy, 1992–2000
Judeca Nova Apartments, Giudecca, Venice, 1995–2003
"In der Wiesen" Social Housing, Vienna, 1996–2000
Millennium Tower, Handelskai, Vienna, 1997–1999
Railway Square, Krems an der Donau, Austria, 1997
Hotel and Conference Centre, Mons, Ljubljana, 2000–2004
City Square, Motta di Livenza, Italy, 2001–2002
Praterstern Urban Square, Vienna, 2002–2008
VBio Center 1, Vienna, 2003–2005
Skidome und Multi-Functional Center, Garching bei München, Germany, 2005
Punta Skala Resort, Zadar, Croatia, 2005-
Station San Pasquale, Napoli, Italy, 2006-
Šumi Center, Ljubljana, Slovenia, 2006 -
Science and Technology Museum, Belgrade, Serbia, 2007-
Civic-Cultural Centre in Ajdovščina, Slovenia, 2010 -
Grain Bridge, Ljubljana, 2010
PP1 project (skyscraper and "city cottages"), Padua, 2010 -
Hotel Falkensteiner, Belgrade, Serbia, 2012

Awards 
1986: Ordre des Arts et des Lettres, Paris
1990: Kulturpreis für Architektur, Vienna
1992: Jože Plečnik Award, Ljubljana
1996: Honorary Member of the Federation of German Architects
2000: Honorary degree of the University of Maribor, Slovenia
2003: Liberty Award by the President of the Republic of Slovenia

References
 Boeckl, Matthias: Boris Podrecca. Public Spaces, Chronicle Books, 2003, 
 AA.VV., Boris Podrecca. Architettura e Poetica della diversità, Lezioni di Architettura e Design, vol 44, Corriere della Sera, Milan, Italy, 2016

1940 births
Living people
Austrian architects
Slovenian architects
Members of the Serbian Academy of Sciences and Arts
TU Wien alumni
Austrian people of Slovenian descent
Italian Slovenes
Architects from Trieste
Artists from Vienna
Urban designers
Austrian people of Serbian descent
Chevaliers of the Ordre des Arts et des Lettres